Coomera railway station is located on the Gold Coast line in Queensland, Australia. It serves the Gold Coast suburb of Coomera.

History
Coomera station opened on 25 February 1996 when the Gold Coast line opened from Beenleigh to Helensvale. A track duplication to the south of the station, linking with Helensvale, was completed in October 2017. The new track provides additional capacity in time for the 2018 Commonwealth Games. The duplication required the construction of 8 new rail bridges, including one with a span of 860 metres across the Coomera River, Hope Island Road and Saltwater Creek.

Services
Coomera is served by Gold Coast line services from Varsity Lakes to Bowen Hills, Doomben and Brisbane Airport Domestic.

Services by platform

Transport links
Surfside Buslines operate seven routes from Coomera station:
TX7: (formerly 720) to Helensvale station via Dreamworld, Movie World & Wet n Wild
721: to Ormeau station via Upper Coomera
722: to Ormeau station via Pimpama
723: to Helensvale station via Oxenford
725: to Helensvale station via Upper Coomera
726: to Coomera Waters
727: to Helensvale station via Reserve Road

References

External links

Coomera station Queensland Rail
Coomera station Queensland's Railways on the Internet

Railway stations in Australia opened in 1996
Railway stations in Gold Coast City